Ammar Al-Madany is the current governor of Diwaniyah province, Iraq.

References

Governors of Al-Qādisiyyah Governorate
Living people
Year of birth missing (living people)